Benoy (Benoyn-Khotar) is a rural locality (a selo) in Vedensky District, Chechnya.

Administrative and municipal status 
Municipally, Benoy is incorporated as Benoyskoye rural settlement. It is the administrative center of the municipality and the only settlement included in it.

Geography 

Benoy is located on the left bank of the Khulkhulau River.

The nearest settlements to Benoy are Serzhen-Yurt in the north-west, Marzoy-Mokhk in the north-east, Guni in the east, Khadzhi-Yurt in the south-east, and Tsa-Vedeno in the south.

History 
In 1944, after the genocide and deportation of the Chechen and Ingush people and the Chechen-Ingush ASSR was abolished, the village of Benoy was renamed, and settled by people from the neighboring republic of Dagestan. From 1944 to 1958, it was a part of the Vedensky District of the Dagestan ASSR.

In 1958, after the Vaynakh people returned and the Chechen-Ingush ASSR was restored, the village regained its old Chechen name, Benoy.

Population 
 2002 Census: 502
 2010 Census: 440
 2019 estimate: 557

According to the 2010 Census, the majority of residents of Benoy were ethnic Chechens. The majority of the village's population are from the Benoy teip.

References

Rural localities in Vedensky District